Indrit Prodani (born 20 May 1998) is an Albanian footballer who plays as a defender for Dinamo Tirana in the Kategoria Superiore.

Career

Kastrioti
In January 2020, Prodani signed with Kastrioti, returning to his home country after a year and a half abroad. He made his league debut for the club on 15 February 2020, playing the entirety of a 1-0 victory over Dinamo Tirana.

Dinamo Tirana
On 31 January 2022, Prodani signed with Dinamo Tirana.

References

External links
Indrit Prodani at Sofa Score

1998 births
Living people
KF Laçi players
KS Kastrioti players
FK Dinamo Tirana players
Kategoria Superiore players
Kategoria e Parë players
Albanian footballers
Association football defenders
Albanian expatriate footballers